Václav Melzer (26 August 1878 – 1 May 1968) was a Czech teacher and mycologist, who was part of a group of Czech teachers who became mycologists at the beginning of the 20th century that also included figures such as Jindřich Kučera, Rudolf Veselý, and František Tyttl. A substantial part of his life was spent living and working in Domažlice.

Melzer's scientific work was devoted mainly to Russula, in which he published the first Czech monograph of this basidiomycete genus. His discoveries in this genus included the Russula sardonia variety mellini, described in 1927, and Russula helodes in 1929, based on collections from the Soběslav area. The mycologist Josef Velenovský named the bolete species Boletus melzeri in his honor in 1922, which was initially collected by Melzer in 1920 at Čechtice. Other taxa named after Melzer include the species Lentinus melzeri, Russula melzeri, and Russula lilacea var. melzeriana (now Russula melzeriana); the genera Melzericium and Melzerodontia are also named in his honor.

He is well known in mycology for developing the staining solution Melzer's reagent, which he developed in 1924 as a modification of an older chloral hydrate-containing iodine solution developed by the botanist Arthur Meyer. In Russula, the genus in which Melzer specialized, the amyloid reaction of the basidiospore ornamentation or entire spore is of great taxonomic significance.

References
This article was initially translated from the Czech Wikipedia.

Czech mycologists
Czech educators
People from Domažlice
1878 births
1968 deaths
Austro-Hungarian scientists